Two Man Band is a collaboration between guitarists Peter Tork and James Lee Stanley released in 1996 by Beachwood Recordings. It was Tork's second studio album without The Monkees and the first of three collaborations with Stanley.

Reception

Aaron Badgley of AllMusic wrote "Both artists compliment each other and the music is very accessible. Tork has a wonderfully pleasing and distinctive voice, and Stanley's voice is a perfect blend." In particular, Badgley calls the recording of The Monkees' "Pleasant Valley Sunday" "outstanding", adding "one wonders what direction the Monkees would have taken had Tork had more control."

Track listing

Personnel 
Peter Tork – vocals, acoustic guitar, banjo, producer
James Lee Stanley – vocals, acoustic guitar, producer

References

1996 albums
Collaborative albums
Peter Tork albums